The Tiger Stripes colour scheme is a pattern of painting applied to locomotives to improve visibility. It entails painting the whole locomotive bright yellow, and adding diagonal black stripes to the front and back. It is called 'Tiger Stripes' because of its resemblance to the stripes of a tiger.

References

Railway safety
Locomotives
Rail liveries